The canton of Tavaux is an administrative division of the Jura department, eastern France. It was created at the French canton reorganisation which came into effect in March 2015. Its seat is in Tavaux.

It consists of the following communes:
 
Abergement-la-Ronce
Annoire
Asnans-Beauvoisin
Aumur
Balaiseaux
Bretenières
Chaînée-des-Coupis
Champdivers
Chaussin
Chemin
Chêne-Bernard
Le Deschaux
Les Essards-Taignevaux
Gatey
Les Hays
Longwy-sur-le-Doubs
Molay
Neublans-Abergement
Peseux
Petit-Noir
Pleure
Rahon
Saint-Aubin
Saint-Baraing
Saint-Loup
Séligney
Tassenières
Tavaux
Villers-Robert

References

Cantons of Jura (department)